Antonio López Muñoz (1 April 1850 – 12 March 1929) was a Spanish nobleman, writer and politician who served as Minister of State in 1913, during the reign of King Alfonso XIII of Spain.

Biography
He was born on 1 April 1850 in Huelva, Spain. In 1913 he served as Minister of State. He died on 12 March 1929 in Madrid, Spain.

External links
Personal dossier of the Count of López Muñoz. Spanish Senate

Counts of Spain
Foreign ministers of Spain
1850 births
1929 deaths
Liberal Party (Spain, 1880) politicians
Justice ministers of Spain